A floor trader is a member of a stock or commodities exchange who trades on the floor of that exchange for his or her own account. The floor trader must abide by trading rules similar to those of the exchange specialists who trade on behalf of others. The term should not be confused with floor broker. Floor traders are occasionally referred to as registered competitive traders, individual liquidity providers or locals.

These traders are subject to a screening process before they can trade on the exchange. The people who operate as floor traders are in an open outcry system that has slowly been replaced by automated trading systems and computers that work in the same fashion as humans,  without the interaction of people buying and selling stocks.

Process of becoming a floor trader 
The process of becoming a floor trader, especially for those with insufficient capital, and lacking knowledge and experience, often begins by working as a clerk. The completion of a business degree at a university is not necessary, and very few floor traders used this to begin their careers. Those who have earned a higher degree rarely have an advantage over other floor traders, who have learned their craft by standing on the floor and actually trading.

Much experience must be gained about the stock exchange as possible because it is an extremely fast-paced and competitive work environment. This is crucial to becoming a successful floor trader. Some may decide to work for a brokerage to get an idea of how the system functions or, as mentioned, to work as a clerk or trade-checker for another person. This is often necessary in order to save money for purchasing a membership which can be expensive, though memberships can be leased on a monthly basis, rather than purchased.

Every floor trader (FT) is required to file a completed online Form 8-R and have a fingerprint card. They must also have proof from a contract market that they have been granted the trading privileges to work on the trading field. A non-refundable Floor Trader Application Fee, that comes at the cost of $85.00, is also required to become certified as a floor trader.

Every non-natural person floor trader (FTF) is required to file a completed online Form 7-R. To be granted trading privileges, he must abide by the same process as the floor trader. The application fee comes at a higher cost than an FT with it, totaling $200.

Rise of machines 
The first major electronic alternative was the Instinet, a machine that could bypass the trading floor and handle one another on a personal basis. It did not however begin taking off until the 1980s, but has been a vital player beside those of its likes such as Bloomberg and Archipelago. The use of electronic mediums to conduct tasks done by floor traders has increased throughout the years, however there are many exchanges in the United States such as the NYSE that prefer to use the open outcry method that involves verbal communication. The benefits of using this system are that traders can read people and results with surprisingly lower error rates in comparison to computers that cannot pick up verbal signals.

See also 
Stockbroker
Broker/dealer
Floor broker
Proprietary trading
Market maker

References

Financial markets